Merton Park is a suburb in the London Borough of Merton. It is situated between Colliers Wood, Morden, South Wimbledon and Raynes Park. It is 11 miles (11.7 km) southwest of Charing Cross. The area is part of the historic parish of Merton in West Surrey.

History

Until the last quarter of the 19th century, the parish of Merton was mainly rural. The area now known as Merton Park was farm land owned by City merchant John Innes who was the local "lord of the manor". The rapid development of Wimbledon to the north encouraged Innes to develop his land for housing. He took as his model the garden suburbs (particularly Bedford Park in Chiswick) and developed the tree-lined roads of detached and semi-detached houses for which the area is known.

The northern section of Merton Park each side of Kingston Road (A238) is now a conservation area. The southern section, roughly from Circle Gardens southwards, was developed in the 1920s and 1930s, stimulated by the opening of the London Underground station at Morden. Housing here was developed on a smaller scale and is not as distinguished, nor is the area designated for conservation.

Geography
The approximate boundaries of the Merton Park area can be considered to be Kingston Road (A238) to the north, Dorset Road (B285) and Morden Road (A24) to the east, Martin Way to the south and Cannon Hill Lane to the west. Additionally, the area north of Kingston Road between Merton Hall Road, Avebury Road and Kingswood Road is often included. This definition of the area does not correspond directly with the Local Government ward of the same name which for administrative convenience includes areas as far south as Morden South railway station.

The area contains two state schools: Merton Park Primary and Rutlish School (boys) and is almost entirely residential in character without shops or pubs except a bar at the Old Rutlishians ('Old Ruts') playing field and clubhouse in Poplar Road.

Merton Park is relatively rich in public transport, being served by National Rail, London Underground, and London Trams. 

The area is served by Wimbledon Chase Railway Station, (located just outside the area), and South Merton Railway Station, both providing a 2 t.p.h. Thameslink service towards Central London or Sutton.

Morden tube station provides access to the Northern Line.

The London Trams also serve the area from Merton Park tram stop.

The area is centred on the historic parish church, St Mary's. The church was founded in the 12th century by the Augustinian order of the nearby Merton Priory of which only the Western Gate remains.

Parks in the area include:

 John Innes Park & Recreation Ground
 Mostyn Gardens
 Kendor Gardens
 Church Lane Playing Fields
 St Mary's Glebe

Notable people
John Dimmer, recipient of the Victoria Cross in 1914, lived here.

In the arts, folk singer Sandy Denny was born here.

Ronnie Wood from the Rolling Stones lived on Mostyn Road with his wife Jo and their children after they moved back to the UK from America in 1986. They left the area in 1991.

See also
Merton Park Studios
The Merton Parkas

References

https://www.thetimes.co.uk/article/time-and-place-jo-wood-crgj2r9dmnz

External links
St. Mary the Virgin, Merton
Merton Park Ward Residents Association
Love Merton Park

Areas of London
Districts of the London Borough of Merton